The 1859 Texas gubernatorial election was held on August 1, 1859 to elect the governor of Texas. Incumbent Democratic Governor Hardin Richard Runnels was running for reelection, but was defeated by Sam Houston, who received 57% of the vote.

Results

References

1859
Texas
Gubernatorial
August 1859 events
Sam Houston